The Journal of Late Antiquity is an academic journal and the first international English-language journal devoted to the Late Antiquity. The journal was founded in 2008 and is published twice a year by the Johns Hopkins University Press.

The journal covers methodological, geographical, and chronological facets of Late Antiquity, from the late and post-classical world up to the Carolingian period, and including the late Roman, western European, Byzantine, Sassanid, and Islamic worlds, ca. AD 250-800. The editor in chief is Sabine R. Huebner of the University of Basel (Switzerland).

See also 
 Antiquity

External links 
 
 Journal of Late Antiquity at Project MUSE

Late antiquity
History journals
Publications established in 2008
Biannual journals
Johns Hopkins University Press academic journals
English-language journals